Allen is a stop on the Region of Waterloo's Ion rapid transit system. It is located in the median of King Street in Waterloo, between Allen and John Streets. It opened in 2019.

North of the station, the tracks split bidirectionally, with the northbound track continuing along King Street but the southbound track diverting along Allen to follow Caroline Street. They combine again beyond Erb Street to follow the Waterloo Spur rail line, together northward.

Access to the platform is from the crosswalks, at either Allen Street or John Street.

The station is located directly between two recent condominium developments: 'The Red' to the north, and the 'Bauer Lofts' to the south. Just to the northwest is the City of Waterloo's Adult Recreation Centre, and the 'Circa 1877' condominium.

The station's feature wall consists of red, tan, and white glass tiles in a pattern.

Connections to local GRT bus routes 7 and 16 are available immediately to the north of the station, around the intersection of King and Allen. The 301R Ion rail replacement bus uses the same set of stops as well.

References

External links
 
 

Railway stations in Waterloo, Ontario
Ion light rail stations
2019 establishments in Ontario